The Motherhood University (MHU) is a university in Roorkee, Uttarakhand, India. It was established under the Uttarakhand Govt. Act 05 of 2015 and is recognized by the UGC with the right to award degrees U/S 22[1] by the UGC Act 1956, The University campus is situated in the vicinity of the river Solani on 12 acres land at Roorkee, on the Roorkee-Dehradun Highway.

The University is promoted by "Motherhood Institute of Management & Technology Society". The Society was established in 2004 with the objective to provide education, research and training to youth of Uttarakhand and the country in order to increase their employability. The other objectives of the society are to establish orphanages, clinics, old age homes and charitable hospitals.

The Motherhood University, Roorkee provides multidisciplinary and specialized courses in Arts, Humanities and Social Science, Commerce and Business Studies, Engineering and Technology, Library and Information Science, Mathematical Sciences, Science, Agriculture, Education, Pharmaceutical Sciences, Legal Studies, Paramedical and Allied Health Sciences. The university was awarded "Uttarakhand Education Excellence Award" by Chief Minister Harish Rawat, & Smt. Indra Hridyesh (Higher Education Minister) Govt. of Uttrakhand.

The university also conducts research and development in laboratories for chemistry, Physics, Biology, Electronics Engineering, Mechanical Engineering, Civil Engineering, Electrical Engineering, and Computing.

References

External links
https://mhu.edu.in

Universities in Uttarakhand
Education in Roorkee
Educational institutions established in 2015
2015 establishments in Uttarakhand